Archolaemus luciae is a species of glass knifefish endemic to Brazil where it is found in the Rio Jari, the Rio Trombetas and the Rio Tapajós basins in the eastern Amazon. Also found in the Rio Araguari.

References

Sternopygidae
Fish of South America
Fish of Brazil
Taxa named by Richard Peter Vari
Taxa named by Carlos David Canabarro Machado de Santana
Taxa named by Wolmar B. Wosiacki
Fish described in 2012